Bar is a Turkish folk dance from Eastern Turkey. The word bar is from the Armenian word "Պար" (bar) which means dance. With their structure and formation, they are the dances performed by groups in the open. They are spread, in general, all over the region of Eastern Anatolia, especially in Artvin, Ardahan, Erzurum, Bayburt, Ağrı, Kars, and Erzincan provinces. The characteristic of their formation is that they are performed side-by-side, hand, shoulder and arm-in-arm. Woman and man bars are different from one another. The principal instruments of bar dances are davul and zurna (shrill pipe). Aksak  measures which are the most characteristic measures, in particular, of the Turkish folk music are applied with extremely different and interesting structures in this dance.

A famous song of Bar is called 'Atabarı'.

References

Turkish dances